Michael Anthony McFarlane OBE (born 2 May 1960) is a retired British athlete who competed mainly in the 100 metres and 200 metres. He won an Olympic silver medal in the 4×100 metres relay at the 1988 Seoul Olympics. He was the 200 m gold medallist at the 1982 Commonwealth Games and a 60 metres gold medallist at the 1985 European Athletics Indoor Championships. McFarlane won two further sprint medals at the 1986 Commonwealth Games.

Biography
He lived in the London Borough of Hackney. He started out as a schoolboy winning the English schoolboys' 200 metres on three occasions. This success continued as he went on to win the AAA's junior Indoor 60/200 metre titles. This was followed by an outdoor AAA's junior 200 victory. He was also a South of England Champion and in 1979/1980 he won the European junior and AAA's Indoor 200 metre titles.

In 1980 he went to the Moscow Olympics where he ran in the 200 metres, where he got to the quarter final. He was also a member of the sprint relay team that reached the final and finished 4th in a new British record. In 1982 after winning the U.K. championships 200, he went to his second Commonwealth Games where he won a joint Commonwealth gold alongside 1980 Olympic 100 metre champion Allan Wells in an historic and memorable 200 metres where both men could not be separated, and both claimed gold medals.

In 1984 he won the U.K. championships 100 metres, then went to the Los Angeles Olympics where he reached the final of the 100 metres, and finished an excellent 5th. In 1985 he became European Indoor Champion at 60 metres. In 1986 he competed at his third Commonwealth games where he won bronze in the 100 metres, and silver in the sprint relay. He also reached the European 100 metre final in Stuttgart in 1986 where he finished 6th. He ran in the 100 m at the 1987 World Championships in Athletics, failing to make the final.

He competed for Great Britain in the 1988 Summer Olympics held in Seoul, South Korea in the 4 x 100 metre relay where he won the silver medal with his teammates Elliot Bunney, John Regis and Linford Christie. He subsequently made a successful career in coaching after retirement and is a high performance coach for UK Athletics based at the National Athletics Centre in Lee Valley.

Personal bests
100 metres – 10.22 seconds
200 metres – 20.43 seconds

References

1960 births
Living people
Athletes from London
English male sprinters
British male sprinters
Olympic athletes of Great Britain
Olympic silver medallists for Great Britain
Athletes (track and field) at the 1980 Summer Olympics
Athletes (track and field) at the 1984 Summer Olympics
Athletes (track and field) at the 1988 Summer Olympics
Commonwealth Games gold medallists for England
Commonwealth Games silver medallists for England
Commonwealth Games bronze medallists for England
Commonwealth Games medallists in athletics
Athletes (track and field) at the 1978 Commonwealth Games
Athletes (track and field) at the 1982 Commonwealth Games
Athletes (track and field) at the 1986 Commonwealth Games
European Athletics Championships medalists
World Athletics Championships athletes for Great Britain
Black British sportspeople
People educated at St Aloysius' College, Glasgow
Medalists at the 1988 Summer Olympics
Olympic silver medalists in athletics (track and field)
Officers of the Order of the British Empire
Medallists at the 1982 Commonwealth Games
Medallists at the 1986 Commonwealth Games